This is a list of ports in Cape Verde. The major ports are owned by the Cape Verdean port authority, ENAPOR.

References

 
Cape Verde